Aivars is a Latvian masculine given name. It is borne by over 13,000 men in Latvia and in 2006 was the sixth most popular man's name in the country. Its nameday is celebrated on 29 January.

Its rise to its present popularity began in the late 19th century when it was one of the very many names of Latvian origin either revived or invented during the Latvian National Awakening. It is a Latvian equivalent of the Old Scandinavian name Ivar, one of a group of Old Scandinavian names that first occur in Courland between the 6th and 10th centuries, which in the more obviously Scandinavian form Ivars is borne by a further 9,900+ Latvians and in 2006 was the ninth most popular man's name.

 Aivar is the Estonian form of Aivars and Ivars
 Aivaras is a Lithuanian form of Aivars and Ivars.

Aivars can refer to:
 Aivars Aksenoks (born 1961), Latvian politician, mayor of Riga
 Aivars Drupass (1945–1999), Latvian footballer
 Aivars Endziņš (born 1940), Latvian lawyer and politician
 Aivars Gipslis (1937–2000), Latvian chess grandmaster
 Aivars Kalējs (born 1951), Latvian organist, composer and pianist
 Aivars Lazdenieks (born 1954), Latvian rower and Olympic competitor
 Aivars Leimanis (born 1958), Latvian ballet dancer
 Aivars Lembergs (born 1953), Latvian politician and businessman

In fiction
 Aivars Aleksovitch Terekhov, a character in the Honor Harrington universe

See also
 Ivars
 Aivis
 Aigars

References

Sources
 Pilsonības un Migrācijas Lietu Parvalde (Office of Citizenship and Migration Affairs): personal name database 
 Siliņš, K., 1990: Latviešu personvārdu vārdnīca. Rīga: Zinātne. 

Latvian masculine given names